The Stibo Group was founded in 1794 by Niels Lund as a printing company. Today, The Stibo Group provides information management and print technology software for business operations. It is headquartered in Aarhus, Denmark. They operate internationally through their subsidiaries in Europe, North America and Asia. The company is wholly owned by The Stibo-Foundation.

History 

Stibo was founded in 1794. The company has grown from a traditional local printing house into an international company focusing on graphic processes, production and software.

1794-1825: Early years of printing 

In January 1794, the 41-year-old printer Niels Lund opened a Royal Charter printing house in Aarhus called Aarhus Stiftsbogtrykkerie. Niels Lund applied for the Royal Charter for two reasons. First, to establish a diocesan printing house and address office in the town of Aarhus to be used for the printing of publications from his own publishing house and any publications others asked him to print. Second, to publish a newspaper once a week containing foreign and domestic news, Royal Decrees, promotions, and any notices and publications Lund was asked to include.

On 3 January 1794, the first issue of “The Aarhuus Diocesan Address Office Newspaper, by Royal Charter” was printed.

The Royal Charter meant that Aarhus Stiftsbogtrykkerie was obliged to print various official announcements free of charge. Although this was a financial burden, it kept the wheels of production turning. The printing house produced a regular flow of books and small publications – 136 of which are still in existence today, an estimated half of the total amount produced.

Niels Lund died in 1825.

1890-1920: A growing business 

By the 1880s, Aarhus Stiftsbogtrykkerie's income from commercial printing was as low as DKK 1.000-1.200 per annum. Then 30-year-old Theodor Funch-Thomsen took over managing the company by the 1890s and he played an important part for the printing house in the years to come.

A turning point came when Danish State Railways became a customer, ordering timetables, traffic lists, posters, brochures etc. The income from this customer alone amounted to DKK 30.000-40.000 per annum.

The newspaper's revenue increased from advertisements and improved numbers of subscriptions. Funch-Thomsen helped grow the number of printing orders each year, increasing from zero in 1890 to 500 in 1909. Aarhuus Stiftsbogtrykkerie made big investments in new technologies, for example when the printing house purchased a 16-page Augsburg web press in 1916.

In 1920, Theodor Funch-Thomsen decided to split the company into two halves, dividing the company between newspaper operations and the printing house.

1927-1976: The telephone directories era 
Hans Kiær bought the business in 1927. He undertook a massive new business initiative with, among other things, emphasis on customer service, securing new customers. He also encouraged his son, Erik Kiær, to explore a series of new technologies.

In 1959, JTAS and Aarhuus Stiftsbogtrykkerie signed a contract where the printing company was to produce the four Jutland telephone directories and the Yellow Pages directory . This meant the company purchased new typesetting, new specially-built web presses for telephone directories with various auxiliary machines and a newly established telephone directory printing works with space for rationalized, industrial production. Binding was also no longer required to be outsourced.

In 1959, the printing company bought a section on a new industrial estate in the suburb of Holme, south of Aarhus. They started with 7,500m2. On this site in 1961, the first actual telephone directory printing works was built.

In 1962, the company's total turnover was DKK 8.1 million, of which the telephone directories accounted for DKK 3.2 million. Kiaer and his management secretary, Jørgen Bjerregaard, won yet another lucrative deal in 1964. The deal was to produce every telephone directory in Denmark. 
This paved the way for the company's involvement in more technology-based operations in the printing and graphics industry.

Since a Yellow Pages directory entails a mass of different types and a wealth of illustrations, Aarhuus Stiftsbogtrykkerie had previously done the typesetting for the Jutland Yellow Pages directory in lead. It worked as long as they were only bound to a single book of a manageable size. But now, with the productions of the KTAS (Copenhagen Telefon A/S) Yellow Pages directory with its 1400 pages, it was quickly seen that using lead would be a hopeless endeavour. Consequently, Erik Kiær chose to use computer-controlled printing.

In September 1966, Ingrid and Erik Kiær transferred 99.7% of the shares in the company to the Aarhuus Stiftsbogtrykkerie Foundation – which was established simultaneously.

In 1976, Aarhuus Stiftsbogtrykkerie bought the majority of shares in CCI and a new company, Computer Composition International Europe (CCI Europe/CCI), was established in Denmark. The original Computer Composition Inc. stopped operating and CCI has subsequently established subsidiaries in, for example, the USA.

1976–2009: Business expansion and structure changes 
In 1976, Stibo Catalog was established with the purpose of serving companies by handling their product information for customers. During the 1980s and 1990s, Stibo Catalog set up regional offices in Great Britain, USA, Singapore and Germany.

The management decided to give the new subsidiary considerable independence – while the old printing house kept a similar independence.

For the newly established subsidiary “Stibo Graphic” in Horsens, DKK 75 million was spent in 1990 on a very large web press: a 48-page "Lithoman" from the Man Roland factories. It churned out four-color publications at a speed of 1.3 million pages per hour. In 2000, the Group made its largest technology investments so far by acquiring a 96-page LithoMAN IV.

In 2001, the group invested approximately DKK 180 million in a new corporate residence for CCI Europe. Major changes to the company structure were carried out in 2002. At the same time, the company name was changed from Aarhuus Stiftsbogtrykkerie to Stibo Group. The company was then split into three divisions – Stibo Graphic, CCI Europe and Stibo Catalog.

In 2006, Stibo Group took over Knowbody ApS. Knowbody developed software directed at automating and optimizing graphic production processes with particular focus on Adobe Systems’ product suite.

The foundation which owns Stibo changed its name from Aarhuus Stiftsbogtrykkerie to Stibo-Fonden (The Stibo Foundation) in 2007. Stibo Catalog changed its name to Stibo Systems in 2009 to better align its corporate identity with its expanded strategic focus on Master Data Management software.

The Stibo Group - Company divisions today 

All company divisions are now part of The Stibo Group. Stibo today provides international information management and print technology solutions for business operations especially on the area of customer service. The group consists of four divisions:

 Stibo Systems: Produces enterprise software to gather, manage and share master data across the information supply chain. Their customers are global manufacturers, distributors, retailers and service providers.
 Stibo Graphic: Creates publishing software for print and electronic publishing. The company caters to European publishers of telephone directories, catalogues, periodicals and magazines.
 Stibo DX (formerly CCI Europe): Makes editorial, advertising and archiving systems for newspaper publishers all over the world.
 magPeople: Designs software that is specific for the magazine industry.

References

Software companies of Denmark
Companies based in Aarhus
Danish companies established in 1794